Finesse is the second studio album by American R&B/soul singer Glenn Jones. Released in 1984 on RCA Records. The album features the lead hit single "Show Me" which peaked to number 3 on Billboard's R&B Songs chart and the top 20 hit single "Bring Back Your Love".

Track listing

Personnel and credits
Credits taken from album liner notes.

Lead Vocals – Glenn Jones 
Arranged By [Vocals] – Dana Marshall (2) (tracks: 4, 6), Dana Meyers (tracks: 5), LaLa* (tracks: 7), Leon Sylvers III* (tracks: 1), Sidney Justin (tracks: 8), Wardell Potts, Jr. (tracks: 4, 6, 8) 
Backing Vocals – Bernard Fowler (tracks: 7), Dana Marshall (2) (tracks: 6), Dana Meyers (tracks: 1, 4, 5), Freddie Jackson (tracks: 3)Glenn Jones (tracks: 5, 6, 8), LaLa (tracks: 3, 7), Leon Sylvers III (tracks: 1), Meli'sa Morgan (tracks: 2), Sidney Justin (tracks: 6), Steve Horton (tracks: 2), Yolanda Lee-Lewis (tracks: 7)
Bass – Kevin Walker (tracks: 1), LaLa (tracks: 3), Rickey Smith (tracks: 4 to 6, 8), Wayne Brathwaite (tracks: 2, 3, 7)
Coordinator [Reissue] – Paul M. Robinson
Drum Programming – Kevin Walker (tracks: 1), Steve Horton (tracks: 2), Wayne Brathwaite (tracks: 2)
Drums – J.T. Lewis (tracks: 3, 7), Wardell Potts, Jr. (tracks: 4 to 6, 8)
Guitar – Chuck Gentry (2) (tracks: 5), Earnest "Pepper" Reed* (tracks: 1, 4), Marlo Henderson (tracks: 1)Steve Horton (tracks: 2, 3, 7), Steve Recker (tracks: 7, 8)
Keyboards – Barry Eastmond (tracks: 3, 7), Kevin Walker (tracks: 1), LaLa (tracks: 2, 3), Rickey Smith (tracks: 4 to 6, 8), Steve Horton (tracks: 2)Wardell Potts, Jr. (tracks: 4), Wayne Brathwaite (tracks: 7) 
Percussion – Jorge Bermudez (tracks: 4, 6), LaLa (tracks: 3), Leon Sylvers III (tracks: 1), Steve Horton (tracks: 2, 3), Terrance Floyd (tracks: 5)Wardell Potts, Jr. (tracks: 8), Wayne Brathwaite (tracks: 3)
Piano, Soloist – Barry Eastmond (tracks: 7) 
Synthesizer [Bass] – Kevin Walker (tracks: 1), Rickey Smith (tracks: 4 to 6, 8)
Synthesizer [Synclavier] – Kashif (tracks: 3) 
Executive-Producer – Louise C. West 
Engineer [Mastering] – Tom Coyne
Engineer [Recording] – Jim Shifflet, Kirk Ferraioli, Les Cooper, Mike Frenke 
Mastered By – Tony Wells 
Producer – LaLa Cope (tracks: 2, 3, 7), Leon Sylvers III (tracks: 1 to 6, 8, 9), Robert Wright (tracks: 10, 11)Steve Horton (tracks: 2, 3, 7), Wayne Brathwaite (tracks: 2, 3, 7)
Production Manager [Reissue] – Matt Murphy 
Reissue Producer – Donald Cleveland, Tony Calvert
Remastered By – Mark Wilder
Remix [Engineer] – Michael H. Brauer (tracks: 10, 11)
Remix producer – Nick Martinelli & David Todd (tracks: 1, 2, 5, 6)

Phonographic Copyright (p) – RCA/JIVE Label Group
Copyright (c) – Funkytowngrooves USA
Manufactured By – Sony Music Entertainment

Charts

Weekly charts

Year-end charts

Singles

References

External links
  Glenn Jones - Finesse at All Music
  Glenn Jones - Finesse at Discogs

1984 debut albums
RCA Records albums
Albums produced by Leon Sylvers III
Contemporary R&B albums by American artists